National legislatures that formally style themselves Congress of the Republic include: 

Congress of Colombia (Congreso de la República de Colombia)
Congress of Guatemala (Congreso de la República)
Congress of the Republic of Peru (Congreso de la República)
Congress of the Republic (Portugal), of the First Portuguese Republic 1910–1926

See also
Congress